Mamoudou Athie  is a Mauritanian-American actor, producer, and model. He is best known for starring in the 2022 Netflix horror series Archive 81 and supporting roles in films including Jurassic World: Dominion (2022).

Athie began his career in theater—making his Broadway debut in 2015—and subsequently had supporting roles in films like Patti Cake$ (2017), The Circle (2017), Unicorn Store (2017), The Front Runner (2018), and Underwater (2020), and in the television series The Get Down (2016–2017), The Detour (2017), Sorry for Your Loss (2018–2019), and the FXX anthology Cake (2019). He had first feature film starring roles in 2020, starring in Netflix's Uncorked and Amazon's Black Box.

Athie was nominated for Primetime Emmy Award for Outstanding Actor in a Short Form Comedy or Drama Series for his performance in Cake.

Early life
Athie was born in Mauritania, the son of a diplomat father who received political asylum in the U.S. when Athie was six months old. Athie grew up in New Carrollton, Maryland, outside of Washington, D.C.

He studied acting at the William Esper Studio in the Two-Year Professional Actor Training Program; he later received his MFA from the Yale School of Drama, from which he graduated in 2014.

Filmography

Film

Television

Video games

Theater 
Selected professional credits

References

External links

Living people
American male film actors
American male television actors
American male voice actors
Male actors from Maryland
Mauritanian male actors
People from Prince George's County, Maryland
Yale School of Drama alumni
Mauritanian emigrants
American people of Mauritanian descent
1988 births